Matthew Warchus (born 24 October 1966) is a British theatre director, filmmaker, lyricist, and playwright.  He has been the Artistic Director of London's The Old Vic since September 2015.

Personal life
Warchus is married to American actress Lauren Ward, who originated the role of Miss Honey in the Stratford-upon-Avon, London, and Broadway productions of Matilda the Musical. Ward and Warchus met when he directed her in the 2001 revival of Follies on Broadway. They have three children.

Career
Warchus attended Selby High School.  He studied music and drama at Bristol University and has directed for the National Youth Theatre, Bristol Old Vic, Donmar Warehouse, Royal Shakespeare Company, Royal National Theatre, Opera North, West Yorkshire Playhouse, Welsh National Opera, English National Opera and in the West End. He won the Globe's Most Promising Newcomer Award for Much Ado About Nothing in the West End, the Evening Standard Best Director award, and Olivier Award nominations for Henry V and Volpone.

Productions include Sejanus his Fall (Edinburgh), "Master Harold"...and the Boys (Bristol Old Vic), The Suicide, Coriolanus (National Youth Theatre), Life is a Dream, Plough and the Stars, True West (Donmar Warehouse), Henry V, The Devil is an Ass, Hamlet (RSC), Volpone (RNT), Troilus and Cressida (Opera North), Rake's Progress (Welsh National Opera), Falstaff (Opera North & ENO), and Art (West End and Broadway).

His 1997 productions of Hamlet at the Barbican Theatre and Falstaff at the English National Opera have been nominated for several Olivier Awards including Best Director. Hamlet was also seen at the Brooklyn Academy in New York and the Kennedy Center in Washington, D.C. 

Warchus directed Yasmina Reza's plays The Unexpected Man (RSC) and Life x 3 (National Theatre) in London and New York (at, respectively, the Promenade Theatre and Circle in the Square Theatre). In 1999, he completed his debut feature film – an adaptation of Sam Shepard's play Simpatico – which he co-wrote and directed, starring Nick Nolte, Jeff Bridges, Albert Finney and Sharon Stone. In 2000 he directed Sam Shepard's True West starring Philip Seymour Hoffman and John C. Reilly. In 2002 he directed Our House, at the Cambridge Theatre, a new musical written by Tim Firth featuring the music of Madness which won the Olivier Award for Best New Musical.

In 2007 he directed The Lord of the Rings, the stage adaptation of the novel The Lord of the Rings, which played at the Theatre Royal, Drury Lane from May 2007 to July 2008 and which he wrote the music and book for. It was the most expensive stage production ever at the time of its debut. In 2008 he directed David Mamet's Speed-the-Plow, starring Kevin Spacey and Jeff Goldblum and Alan Ayckbourn's trilogy of plays The Norman Conquests at London's The Old Vic, and Boeing Boeing at New York's Broadhurst Theatre for which he received a Tony Award nomination for Best Direction of a Play.

During the 2009 Broadway season, Warchus directed two productions. One was the critically lauded, 2009 Tony Award winner for Best Revival of a Play transfer of his Old Vic production of The Norman Conquests, for which he won the Drama Desk Award for Outstanding Director of a Play. The other was the 2009 Tony Award winner for Best Play, Yasmina Reza's God of Carnage, for which Warchus won the Tony Award for Best Direction of a Play.

In 2010, Warchus directed the acclaimed Royal Shakespeare Company musical Matilda, with a book by Dennis Kelly and music and lyrics by Tim Minchin, which transferred to the West End in October 2011 at the Cambridge Theatre, before opening at the Shubert Theatre on Broadway in March 2013. The musical has since gone on to tour the US, Australia and New Zealand, winning multiple awards with a record-breaking seven Olivier Awards including Best New Musical and Best Director for Warchus.

Warchus's production of Ghost: The Musical, a stage adaptation of the Academy Award winning 1990 film Ghost, premiered at the Manchester Opera House in March 2011, and opened at the West End's Piccadilly Theatre in July 2011 and closed on 6 October 2012. The show transferred to Broadway beginning at the Lunt Fontanne Theater on 15 March 2012 and closed on 18 August 2012. Ghost The Musical was on tour in UK and USA in 2013 while also playing in Budapest. It opened in Korea in November 2013.

His film Pride was selected to be screened as part of the Directors' Fortnight section of the 2014 Cannes Film Festival, where it won the Queer Palm award on 23 May 2014.

A film adaptation of Matilda the Musical based on the stage musical, also directed by Warchus with screenplay by Dennis Kelly and songs by Tim Minchin was released by Netflix on 23 November 2022 in the United Kingdom and 9 December 2022 in the United States.

The Old Vic 
In May 2014 Warchus was announced as the new Artistic Director of The Old Vic in London, succeeding Kevin Spacey.

His first season began in September 2015 directing a new play, Future Conditional by Tamsin Oglesby, starring Rob Brydon. In 2016 he also directed The Master Builder by Henrik Ibsen starring Ralph Fiennes, The Caretaker by Harold Pinter starring Timothy Spall, Daniel Mays and George Mackay, and the world premiere of the new musical Groundhog Day with book by Danny Rubin and music and lyrics by Tim Minchin. The musical ran for 8 weeks from July to September 2016 before transferring to the August Wilson Theatre on Broadway from April to September 2017.

His second season saw him direct the 20th anniversary revival of 'Art' starring Rufus Sewell, Tim Key and Paul Ritter from December 2016 to February 2017 (followed by UK tours in 2018 and 2019). He also directed a new adaptation of A Christmas Carol by Jack Thorne starring Rhys Ifans as Scrooge for Christmas 2017, and returned for Christmas 2018 starring Stephen Tompkinson as Scrooge.

In 2019 he directed a revival of Noël Coward's Present Laughter starring Andrew Scott, followed by Duncan Macmillan's Lungs starring Claire Foy and Matt Smith before a return of A Christmas Carol starring Paterson Joseph as Scrooge. His production of A Christmas Carol was also performed on Broadway over the 2019-20 festive season at the Lyceum Theatre starring Campbell Scott as Scrooge, with Andrea Martin and LaChanze.

In 2020, Warchus was planned to direct Amy Herzog’s 4000 Miles starring Eileen Atkins and Timothée Chalamet in April to May 2020, however due to the COVID-19 pandemic, the production has been postponed with the rescheduled dates to be announced. Also his production of Lungs which was due to transfer with Claire Foy and Matt Smith reprising their roles to the Brooklyn Academy of Music, New York in March to April 2020 was also cancelled due to the pandemic.

During the COVID-19 pandemic a series called Old Vic: in Camera began broadcasting performances from the empty auditorium of The Old Vic live to audiences around the world via Zoom, beginning with a social distanced version of Lungs with Claire Foy and Matt Smith returning. This was followed by a two new plays; Three Kings by Stephen Beresford starring Andrew Scott, Faith Healer by Brian Friel starring Michael Sheen, David Threlfall and Indira Varma followed by A Christmas Carol (which was due to return for a fourth consecutive season) starring Andrew Lincoln as Scrooge.

Filmography
 Simpatico (1999) (director, screenwriter, co-producer)
 Pride (2014) (director)
 Matilda the Musical (2022) (director)

Awards and nominations

Olivier Awards

Tony Awards

Drama Desk Awards

Outer Critics Circle Awards

British Independent Film Awards

References

External links
 
 
 "PLAYBILL.COM'S BRIEF ENCOUNTER With Matthew Warchus", Robert Simonson, 20 May 2009
 Yahoo! biography
 Filmbug biography
 The Lord of the Rings Stage Show (Book, Lyrics and Direction by Matthew Warchus) (unofficial fansite)

1966 births
Living people
Alumni of the University of Bristol
British film directors
British theatre directors
Laurence Olivier Award winners
People from Rochester, Kent
Tony Award winners
People educated at Selby High School
National Youth Theatre members
Helpmann Award winners